Kibara is a genus of plants in family Monimiaceae. It contains the following species (but this list may be incomplete):
 Kibara coriacea (Blume) Tulasne
 Kibara macrophylla (A. Cunn.) Benth.

References

Monimiaceae genera
Taxonomy articles created by Polbot